Rhodacarus is a genus of mites in the family Rhodacaridae. There are more than 20 described species in Rhodacarus.

Species
These 29 species belong to the genus Rhodacarus:

 Rhodacarus aequalis Karg, 1971
 Rhodacarus agrestis Karg, 1971
 Rhodacarus angustiformis Willmann, 1951
 Rhodacarus berrisfordi Loots, 1969
 Rhodacarus calcarulatus Berlese, 1920
 Rhodacarus clavulatus Athias-Henriot, 1961
 Rhodacarus coronatus Berlese, 1920
 Rhodacarus cuneatus Athias-Henriot, 1961
 Rhodacarus fatrensis Kalúz, 1994
 Rhodacarus furmanae Shcherbak, 1975
 Rhodacarus gracilis Shcherbak, 1980
 Rhodacarus haarlovi Shcherbak, 1977
 Rhodacarus laureti Athias-Henriot, 1961
 Rhodacarus longisetosus Shcherbak, 1980
 Rhodacarus mandibularis Berlese, 1920
 Rhodacarus mandibularosimilis Shcherbak & Kadite, 1979
 Rhodacarus marksae Domrow, 1957
 Rhodacarus matatlanticae Castilho & Moraes, 2010
 Rhodacarus olgae Shcherbak, 1975
 Rhodacarus pallidus Hull, 1918
 Rhodacarus reconditus Athias-Henriot, 1961
 Rhodacarus rhodacaropsis Ryke, 1962
 Rhodacarus roseus Oudemans, 1902
 Rhodacarus salarius Karg, 1993
 Rhodacarus solimani Fouly & Nawar, 1990
 Rhodacarus strenzkei Willmann, 1957
 Rhodacarus tribaculatus Athias-Henriot, 1961
 Rhodacarus willmanni Karg, 1993
 Rhodacarus zaheri Fouly & Nawar, 1990

References

Rhodacaridae